The windmills at Kinderdijk are a group of 19 monumental windmills in the Alblasserwaard polder, in the province of South Holland, Netherlands. Most of the mills are part of the village of Kinderdijk in the municipality of Molenlanden, and one mill, De Blokker, is part of the municipality of Alblasserdam. Built in 1738 and 1740, to keep water out of the polder, it is the largest concentration of old windmills in the Netherlands and one of the best-known Dutch tourist sites. The mills are listed as national monuments and the entire area is a protected village view since 1993. They have been a UNESCO World Heritage Site since 1997.

History 
Kinderdijk lies in the Alblasserwaard, at the confluence of the Lek and Noord rivers. In Alblasserwaard, problems with water became more and more apparent in the 13th century. Large canals, called "weteringen", were dug to get rid of the excess water in the polders. However, the drained soil started setting, while the level of the river rose due to the river's sand deposits. Most of the current mills were built in 1738 and 1740 (see below).

After a few centuries, an additional way to keep the polders dry was required. It was decided to build a series of windmills, with a limited capacity to bridge water level differences, but just able to pump water into a reservoir at an intermediate level between the soil in the polder and the river; the reservoir could be let out into the river through locks whenever the river level was low enough; the river level has both seasonal and tidal variations. Although some of the windmills are still used, the main water works are provided by two diesel pumping stations near one of the entrances of the windmills site.

Description 

The 19 stone mills of the Netherlands were built in 1738, the wooden mills of the Overwaard in 1740. The former move the drainage water from the lower polders of the Alblasserwaard into a reservoir, the latter that from the higher polders. Both reservoirs used to drain in turn into the river Lek by means of locks during low river water levels; nowadays modern pumping stations are in place.

List of windmills 

This is a list of the 19 mills:

De Nederwaard
 Nederwaard Molen No.1
 Nederwaard Molen No.2
 Nederwaard Molen No.3
 Nederwaard Molen No.4
 Nederwaard Molen No.5
 Nederwaard Molen No.6
 Nederwaard Molen No.7
 Nederwaard Molen No.8

De Overwaard
 Overwaard Molen No.1
 Overwaard Molen No.2
 Overwaard Molen No.3
 Overwaard Molen No.4
 Overwaard Molen No.5
 Overwaard Molen No.6
 Overwaard Molen No.7
 Overwaard Molen No.8

Nieuw-Lekkerland
 De Hoge Molen
 Kleine of Lage Molen

Alblasserdam
 De Blokker

Modern day 

The mills are listed as national monuments and the entire area is a protected village view since 1993. The mills were inscribed as a UNESCO World Heritage Site at the 21st session of the World Heritage Committee in 1997. The mills are property of the Kinderdijk World Heritage Foundation.

See also 
 Wind pump
 Zaanse Schans

References

External links 

Alblasserdam
Molenlanden
Alblasserwaard
Tourist attractions in South Holland
Windmills in South Holland
World Heritage Sites in the Netherlands